Batiovo is an urban-type settlement in Berehove Raion (district) of Zakarpattia Oblast (province) in western Ukraine. Population:

Geography
The Uzhhorod—Solotvyno railroad line runs through Batiovo, with a station located in the town that serves as a border control between Ukraine with Hungary. The railway in Batiovo is the largest employer for the town's residents.

History
The place was first mentioned in 1205 as Bátyú. During that time, the settlement was located on the banks of the Tisza river, however, frequent floods forced the town's residents to relocate to a further location from the river's banks. In 1816, Batiovo had a total of 310 residents and 54 houses.  In 1910, the settlement was part of the Kingdom of Hungary and had a total of 1,490 inhabitants, the majority of which were Hungarians. In 1921, the local arm of the Communist Party of Czechoslovakia was established in Batiovo.

During World War II, about 40 families from the town were sent to Nazi concentration camps and an additional 90 people were sent to do forced labor. Batiovo became part of the Soviet Union after WWII. In Autumn of 1944, 140 residents were taken prisoner by Soviet forces. In 1946, the settlement's name was changed to Vuzlove or Uzlovoe, which it kept until it was renamed back to "Batiovo" on April 1, 1995.

In 1971, the settlement was granted the status of an urban-type settlement.  In 2001, Batiovo survived a large flood from the Tisza largely in part thanks to the railway line's embankment which stopped the coming waters.

Demographics
The town's population was 3,046 as of the 2001 Ukrainian Census and 3,046 in 2011. Two-thirds of the town's population consists of ethnic Hungarians, with the remaining population consisting of Ukrainians and Russians.

Attractions
The town houses a couple of attractions, including the Reformed Church, which was originally built in 1910, but rebuilt in 1988, and renovated in 2003; as well as the Lónyay Estate, which was nationalized during the Soviet times.

See also
 Hungarians in Ukraine

References

External links
 

Urban-type settlements in Berehove Raion